Robert Fielding (born 1959) is an Australian artist based in Mimili, South Australia. He is known for his recent series of photographs of wrecked cars and other discarded objects on which he has painted colourful designs.

Early life
Fielding was born in Port Lincoln, South Australia, in 1959. His mother, Grieve Fielding, is of Afghan/Pakistani (from the early Afghan cameleers in Australia) and Western Arrernte descent. His father, Bruce Fielding was a Yankunytjatjara man from Aputula, who was forcibly removed from his home at Lilla Creek as a child (one of the Stolen Generations) and taken to Colebrook Home in Quorn, South Australia. Robert was one of 12 children.

Career
Fielding works across several mediums, including installations, photography, painting, film and sculpture. and is based at Mimili Maku Arts. He has also developed skills in writing, curating, and installing exhibitions.

He conducted research in the archives of museums across Australia as part of the Australia Council for the Arts' Signature Works Innovation Lab. During the closure of APY Lands during the COVID-19 pandemic, worked on Fielding led a research project with the South Australian Museum focusing on intergenerational learning and cultural maintenance.

Fielding has created photographs of abandoned objects of modern life such as wrecked cars, decorated with Aboriginal artistic motifs and references to his community, which have featured in exhibitions, such as the installation entitled Holden On which featured in the 4th  National Indigenous Art Triennial.

Fielding created a series of photographs called Mayatjara, comprising photographs of traditional owners, respected leaders and elders, advocates and artists from the APY Lands. It went on display at the Ballarat International Foto Biennale at the Art Gallery of Ballarat in 2021, and was being acquired by the National Portrait Gallery in Canberra in August 2022.

Recognition and awards
 2015: Winner, NATSIAA Telstra Work on Paper Award
 2015: Winner, Desart Photography Prize
 2017: Finalist, Macquarie Group Foundation First Nations Emerging Curator Award, which gave him the opportunity to undertake an exchange to Canada
 2017: Winner, NATSIAA Telstra Work on Paper Award
 2019: Winner, Banyule Award for Work on Paper

Exhibitions

Group exhibitions
2018: A Lightness of Spirit is the Measure of Happiness, at the Australian Centre for Contemporary Art in Melbourne; featuring 10 specially commissioned works by Aboriginal artists of south-east Australia, including Fielding, Vincent Namatjira, Yhonnie Scarce, Kaylene Whiskey and others.
2020: Tarnanthi tour of KulataTjuta (Many Spears) at the Musée des Beaux-Arts de Rennes, France
December 2021 – March 2022: (un)learning Australia at Seoul Museum of Art, co-curated with Artspace in Sydney
2022: Ceremony: National Indigenous Art Triennial at the National Gallery of Australia

Solo exhibitions
2018  Graveyards in Between, blackartprojects, Melbourne
2018: First international solo exhibition, at the Fondation Opale in Switzerland,
2020: Routes / Roots, Linden New Art, Melbourne
2021: Manta, blackartprojects, Melbourne

Collections
Fielding's work is held in major collections, including:
Art Gallery of South Australia
Art Gallery of New South Wales
Artbank
National Gallery of Australia 
National Gallery of Victoria 
 Parliament House, Canberra

Personal life
Fielding has eight children with his partner.  he lives at Mimili Community in Anangu Pitjantjatjara Yankunytjatjara (APY Lands).

References

1959 births
Living people
Australian painters
Indigenous Australian artists
Artists from South Australia